The 1972 Cornell Big Red football team was an American football team that represented Cornell University during the 1972 NCAA University Division football season. A year after winning a share of the Ivy League title, Cornell dropped to a third-place tie. 

In its seventh season under head coach Jack Musick, the team compiled a 6–3 record and outscored opponents 238 to 183. Bob Joehl was the team captain. 

Cornell's 4–3 conference record tied for third-best in the Ivy League standings. The Big Red outscored Ivy opponents 155 to 154. 

Cornell played its home games at Schoellkopf Field in Ithaca, New York.

Schedule

References

Cornell
Cornell Big Red football seasons
Cornell Big Red football